Jo Sarjant (born 11 December 1981) is a basketball player for England women's national basketball team. Sarjant won a bronze medal at the 2006 Commonwealth Games. She was part of England's first women's basketball squad that competed at the Commonwealth Games.

References

1981 births
Living people
English women's basketball players
Place of birth missing (living people)
Guards (basketball)
Commonwealth Games medallists in basketball
Commonwealth Games bronze medallists for England
Basketball players at the 2006 Commonwealth Games
Medallists at the 2006 Commonwealth Games